Kristian Henri Mikael Pulli (born 2 September 1994) is Finnish athlete specialising in the long jump. He has 2 golden, 3 silver and 1 bronze medal from Finnish Championships Kalevan Kisat. Most of them from long jump. In triple jump he has won silver twice. 

His current record in long jump is 8.27 m which he jumped in Espoo in June 2020. This is also the current national record, while his indoor record is 8.24 from Toruń in March 2021.

He has qualified to represent Finland at the 2020 Summer Olympics.

Competition record

References

1994 births
Living people
Finnish male long jumpers
Finnish Athletics Championships winners
People from Jämsä
Athletes (track and field) at the 2020 Summer Olympics
Olympic athletes of Finland
Sportspeople from Central Finland
21st-century Finnish people